The Queen's Service Medal is a medal awarded by the government of New Zealand to recognise and reward volunteer service to the community and also public service in elected or appointed public office.  It was established in 1975 and is related to the Queen's Service Order. The QSM replaced the Imperial Service Medal as an award of New Zealand.

Appearance

1975–2007
The original medal was made of sterling silver,  in diameter. The obverse bears the same effigy of The Queen as the badge of the Queen's Service Order.  Surrounding the effigy are the Royal styles and titles "ELIZABETH II DEI GRATIA REGINA F.D.". The reverse depicts the New Zealand Coat of Arms surrounded by the inscription "The Queen's Service Medal" and the name of the sub-division either "for Community Service" or "for Public Services". The initials and name of the recipient is engraved on the rim of the Medal.  The medals were made by the Royal Mint.

2007–present
The current medal is also made of sterling silver, and is 36 mm in diameter. The obverse bears the Ian Rank-Broadley designed effigy of The Queen. The effigy is surrounded by the Royal styles and titles "ELIZABETH II QUEEN OF NEW ZEALAND". The reverse bears the New Zealand Coat of Arms surrounded by the inscription "The Queen's Service Medal" above and "for service – MO NGA MAHI NUI" below.  The new Badge and Medal are made by Thomas Fattorini Limited, of Birmingham, United Kingdom.

Ribbon
Both versions of the medal are suspended from a ribbon 36 mm wide. The edges are a narrow red ochre (kokowhai) stripe.  The center has alternating stripes of red ochre, white and black in a descending step pattern from left to right. The design is inspired by the Māori Poutama pattern used in Tukutuku wall panels. It is usually interpreted as the "stairway to heaven", but in this case it refers to "steps of service".

See also
 British and Commonwealth orders and decorations
 New Zealand Honours System

References

External links
Statutes of the Queen's Service Order

Civil awards and decorations of New Zealand